Scionini is a tribe of horse and deer flies in the family Tabanidae.

Genera
Anzomyia Lessard, 2012
Aotearomyia  Lessard, 2014
Apocampta Schiner, 1868
Copidapha Enderlein, 1922
Fidena Walker, 1850
Lepmia Fairchild, 1969
Myioscaptia Mackerras, 1955
Osca Walker, 1850
Palimmecomyia Taylor, 1917
Parosca Enderlein, 1922
Pityocera Giglio-Tos, 1896
Plinthina Walker, 1850
Pseudomelpia Enderlein, 1922
Pseudoscione Lutz, 1918
Scaptia Walker, 1850
Plinthina Walker, 1850
Scione Walker, 1850
Triclista Enderlein, 1922

References

Tabanidae
Brachycera tribes
Taxa named by Günther Enderlein